The Macau women's national volleyball team represents Macau in international women's volleyball competitions and friendly matches.

They qualified for the 1987 Asian Women's Volleyball Championship and the 1989 Asian Women's Volleyball Championship.

References
Macau Volleyball Federation

National women's volleyball teams
Volleyball
Volleyball in Macau
Women's sport in Macau